New Horizon (Yeni horizont) is a 1940 Soviet drama produced by the Baku Film Studio (the Azerbaijani SSR's state film production company), starring Ismail Efendivev, Rza Afganli, Alesker Alekperov, and Ali Gurbanov.

Plot

The film tells about the life of Baku oil workers and the discovery of new oil fields. The conflict in the film is based on the contradiction of inertia, conservatism and ahamism, which are the remnants of anility, with its innovative idea in the world of science.

Cast
Ismail Efendiev - Adil Kərimov
Rza Afganli -Professor Əhmədov
Alesker Alekperov -Partiya təşkilatçısı Aslanov
Ali Gurbanov - Heydər
Sofa Bashirzade - Validə
Aziza Mamedova - Fatma
Movsun Sanani - Ruben
Mustafa Mardanov - Trest müdiri
Ali-Sattar Melikov - Rüstəm Abbasov
V. Chavchavadze - Tibb bacısı

Production
Written by: Imran Kasumov
Directed by: Aga-Rza Kuliev, Grigory Braginsky
Photography directors: Fyodor Novitsky, Mukhtar Dadashov
Music by: Niyazi
Sound engineer: Ilya Ozersky
Lyricist: Aliaga Wahid
Assistant stage manager: Latif Safarov, Mamed Alili (the latter is uncredited)
Assistant cameraman: Teyyub Akhundov
Cutter and assistant stage manager: Zeinab Kazimova

Sources

Şəmsəddin Abbasov. “Sovet Azərbaycanının kinosu” //Kommunist.- 1958.- 29 avqust.
Azerbaijan SSR cinematography. Cinema: Encyclopedical dictionary / Сhief editor S. I. Yutkevich; Editorial board: Y.S. Afanasyev, V.E.Baskakov, I.V. Vaysfeld and others. — Moscow: Soviet Encyclopedia, 1987. — page 12.
Azerbaijan SSR cinematography. Cinema: Encyclopedical dictionary / Сhief editor S. I. Yutkevich; Editorial board: Y.S. Afanasyev, V.E.Baskakov, I.V. Vaysfeld and others. — Moscow: Soviet Encyclopedia, 1987. — page 222.
Azərbaycan SSR Elmlər Akademiyası. Memarlıq və İncəsənət İnstitutu. Nazim Sadıxov. "Ağarza Quliyev haqqında qeyd". Azərbaycan bədii kinosu (1920-1935-ci illər). Bakı: Elm, 1970.- səh. 26
Azərbaycan Respublikası Mədəniyyət Nazirliyi. C.Cabbarlı adına "Azərbaycanfilm" kinostudiyası. Aydın Kazımzadə. Bizim "Azərbaycanfilm". 1923-2003-cü illər. Bakı: Mütərcim, 2004.- səh. 63-64.
Azərbaycan Milli Ensiklopediyası: Azərbaycan. Ramiz Məmmədov. Kino. Azərbaycan Milli Ensiklopediyası Elmi Mərkəzi, 2007.- səh. 813.

References

External links